Robert Roderick McDonald (born 22 January 1959) is an English former professional footballer who played as a striker or midfielder for Hull City, SC Cambuur, FC Wageningen, Willem II Tilburg, FC Groningen, PSV Eindhoven, Sporting Clube de Portugal, Racing Jet de Bruxelles, Ikast FS, Newcastle United, Beşiktaş and BV Veendam.

McDonald also enjoyed a career in football management, with DOVO, De Graafschap, Ajax Cape Town, SC Cambuur, VVOG, Sligo Rovers and AS Trenčín. As manager of Sligo Rovers, McDonald tried to sell Séamus Coleman whom he did not rate as a footballer. McDonald was sacked shortly afterwards and barely two seasons later Coleman was signed by English Premier League side Everton whom he would go on to captain as well as becoming captain of the Republic of Ireland national team.

He returned at amateurs DOVO, based in Veenendaal, in April 2010, accepting an offer to become the club's interim coach until the end of the season. He joined amateurs VV Nunspeet in January 2013, and stayed with the club on the following season as well; in November 2013, it was confirmed he would leave the club by the end of the season.

Honors
PSV Eindhoven
Eredivisie: 1985-86

References

External links
 
 Beijen.net CV 
 Rob McDonald career stats at Voetbal International 
 KHScott.org profile
 

1959 births
Living people
Footballers from Kingston upon Hull
Association football midfielders
Association football forwards
English footballers
Hull City A.F.C. players
SC Cambuur players
FC Wageningen players
Willem II (football club) players
FC Groningen players
PSV Eindhoven players
Sporting CP footballers
Racing Jet Wavre players
Ikast FS players
Newcastle United F.C. players
Beşiktaş J.K. footballers
SC Veendam players
English Football League players
Eredivisie players
Primeira Liga players
Süper Lig players
English football managers
Ajax Cape Town F.C. managers
Sligo Rovers F.C. managers
AS Trenčín managers
VV DOVO managers
PEC Zwolle non-playing staff
English expatriate footballers
English expatriate football managers
English expatriate sportspeople in the Netherlands
Expatriate footballers in the Netherlands
English expatriate sportspeople in Portugal
Expatriate footballers in Portugal
English expatriate sportspeople in Belgium
Expatriate footballers in Belgium
English expatriate sportspeople in Denmark
Expatriate men's footballers in Denmark
English expatriate sportspeople in Turkey
Expatriate footballers in Turkey
English expatriate sportspeople in South Africa
Expatriate soccer managers in South Africa
English expatriate sportspeople in Slovakia
Expatriate football managers in Slovakia
English expatriate sportspeople in Ireland
Expatriate football managers in the Republic of Ireland